Nana is a commune in Călărași County, Muntenia, Romania. It is composed of a single village, Nana.

As of 2007 Nana has a population of 2,497.

References

Communes in Călărași County
Localities in Muntenia